Hon'ble Dr. Justice Sir Khan Bahadur Khuda Bakhsh OIE (2 August 1842 - 3 August 1908) was an Indian Polymath who was an advocate, judge, philosopher, explorer, revolutionary freedom fighter, scholar and historian from Patna, Bihar. He was the founder of Khuda Bakhsh Oriental Library and Chief Justice of Nizam's Supreme Court of Hyderabad from 1895 to 1898. He is considered to be one of the most prominent Indian Muslim along with APJ Abdul Kalam.

Life and family
HMJ Sir Khuda Bakhsh was born into a prominent Nobel family in Patna and was brought up under the guidance of his father, Sir Muhammed Bakhsh, a famous advocate and Zamindar from Patna, Bihar. He started his career as a Peshkar in 1868. He later on became the Government pleader of Patna in 1880. At the same time, his father became very ill. In his dying breath, he requested his son to open a public library. He inherited 1,400 manuscripts from his father and opened the library to the public in 1891, expanding the collection to 4,000 manuscripts and 80,000 books. He became the first director of the library and remained in that position until his death, except for a brief period from 1895 to 1898 when he was serving as Chief Justice of the Supreme Court of Hyderabad. He gave the responsibility of running the library to his student Dr. Sachchidananda Sinha. Khuda Bakhsh's Son, Sir Salahuddin Khuda Bakhsh, later became good friends with Sinha and work together in establishing his own library known as Sinha Library.

Sir Khuda Bakhsh had a great relationship with his four sons. All of them continued their father's legacy.

Historically, the House of Bakhsh is a family of poets, lawyers, administrators, and most notably as judges and scholars. It included Qadi Hibstullah, who worked along with Emperor Aurangzeb to compile the Fatwa-i-Alamgiri. The House of Bakhsh were the official record keepers who were given the responsibility by the Mughal Emperors to write day-to-day activities across the Mughal Empire.

Foundation of Oriental Public Library

Sir Khuda Bakhsh inherited the private library from his father Muhammad Bakhsh and promised him in his death bed in 1876 that he will open the library for public. He hired Muhammad Maki to acquire books and manuscripts for a monthly income of Rs. 50. In 1890 Bakhsh built a two-story library for Rs. 80,000 which was inaugurated in 1891 by the former Lieutenant-Governor of Bengal, Sir Charles Elliott. He donated his manuscripts and books to the public on 14 January 1891.

Sir Khuda Bakhsh was approached by the representatives of the British Museum who made a stunning offer to purchase his collection, but he declined. He informed VC Scott O'Connor, an orientalist based in Edinburgh, England.  "I am a poor man and the sum they offered me was a princely fortune, but could I ever part for money with that to which my father and I have dedicated our lives?" "No" he said "the collection is for Patna and the gift shall be laid at the feet of the Patna public".

The library was designated as an institution of national importance on 26 December 1969. By an act of Parliament.

Death
Khuda Bakhsh was a very simple man with great vision and commitment. He died on 3 August 1908 and was buried in the library primase.

Legacy and recognition 
Sir Khuda Bakhsh was given the title of "Khan Bahadur" in 1881. He was knighted with the Order of the Indian Empire in 1903.

The Khuda Bakhsh Award for scholars for their lifetime achievements in the fields in which the library specializes was created in his honor in 1992. Mahatma Gandhi commented on the legacy of Bakhsh: "I heard about this beautiful library nine years ago and I've been looking forward to seeing it ever since. I was very happy to see the priceless treasure of rare books here. I pay tribute to the great founder of this library who has spent every penny to give this invaluable treasure to India."

References

External links
Khuda Bakhsh Oriental Library official website 
Official Ministry of Culture, Govt of India Page for Khuda Bakhsh Oriental Library

1842 births
1908 deaths
Historians of India
Chief Justices of Hyderabad
Khan Bahadurs